Indian Mound is an unincorporated community in Stewart County, Tennessee, United States. It has a post office, with ZIP code 37079.

Pleasant Grove Baptist Church is located in Indian Mound at 2904 Highway 79.  It has been in existence since 1919.

Notes

Unincorporated communities in Stewart County, Tennessee
Unincorporated communities in Tennessee